The 2023 Omloop Het Nieuwsblad is a road cycling one-day race that took place on 25 February 2023 in Belgium, starting in Gent and finishing in Ninove. It was the 78th edition of the Omloop Het Nieuwsblad and the fourth event of the 2023 UCI World Tour.

Teams 
Twenty-five teams participated in the race, including all eighteen UCI WorldTour teams and seven UCI ProTeams. Each team entered seven riders, for a total of 171 riders.

Result

References

External links
 

2023 UCI World Tour
2023
Omloop Het Nieuwsblad
Omloop Het Nieuwsblad